Alexander Britton Hume Jr. (September 2, 1969 – February 22, 1998), known as Sandy Hume, was an American journalist. He worked for The Hill newspaper in Washington, D.C. He was the son of Brit Hume (former Fox News Channel managing editor) and

Career
Born and raised in the Washington, D.C. area, Hume attended Middlebury College in Vermont, lettered in varsity lacrosse for the Panthers, and graduated  He embarked on a career in journalism, and broke the story of the aborted 1997 "coup" by U.S. Rep. Bill Paxon (R-NY) against Speaker Newt Gingrich. Another of the plotters, Majority Leader Dick Armey (R-TX), scuttled the coup when he learned that Paxon, and not he, would replace Gingrich. Armey reportedly later disavowed the whole attempt when he learned that he would not be the one to become speaker.

Veteran Washington reporter and commentator Robert Novak called Hume's Republican coup story "perhaps the greatest expose of behind-the-scenes Capitol Hill machinations that I had seen in half a century of Congress-watching."  When Republican spin-doctors claimed that they merely wanted to warn Gingrich about the "coup", Novak wrote that "after extensive checking of sources, I am convinced that Hume's reporting was 100 percent correct."  Brit Hume stated that Sandy Hume posted Novak's column confirmation column on his wall.  When Sandy Hume died in 1998 at age 28, he had been nominated for a Pulitzer Prize and had been pursued by U.S. News and Fox News.

Death
Hume died by suicide in his apartment in Arlington, Virginia. In the months before his death, Hume, an alcoholic, began drinking again. The night before he died, he was jailed for drunk driving and tried to hang himself in the U.S. Park Police jail cell. He was evaluated at a psychiatric facility and released. He went home and took his life with a hunting rifle after leaving a lengthy note expressing shame at the previous night's events. He was buried at Oak Hill Cemetery in Washington, D.C.

Sandy Hume Memorial Award
The National Press Club honors Hume's memory with the Sandy Hume Memorial Award for Excellence in Political Journalism, awarded annually.

References

External links

1969 births
1998 suicides
American male journalists
The American Spectator people
Suicides by firearm in Virginia
Journalists from Washington, D.C.
20th-century American non-fiction writers
20th-century American male writers
Burials at Oak Hill Cemetery (Washington, D.C.)